KJBN (1050 kHz) is a commercial AM radio station in Little Rock, Arkansas.  The station is currently owned by Joshua Ministries & Community Development Corp. and it airs an urban gospel radio format including some Christian talk and teaching programs.  Hosts pay the station for their time on the air, and may ask for donations during their programs.

KJBN broadcasts at 1,000 watts by day.  But because AM 1050 is a Mexican clear channel frequency, it must greatly reduce power at night to 19 watts to avoid interfering with other stations on its frequency.

History
KJBN first signed on in 1948 as KVLC.  It was owned by the Southwest Broadcasting Company.  The following year it put an FM radio station on the air, 94.1 KVLC-FM (today KKPT).

References

External links
KJBN website

FCC History Cards for KJBN

Contemporary Christian radio stations in the United States
Radio stations established in 1977
JBN